Alexis Evelyn Chris Davis (born October 4, 1984) is a Canadian mixed martial artist who competed in the Ultimate Fighting Championship (UFC) where she is a former Title challenger. She is a Canadian Open grappling champion.

Early life
Davis was a young girl when she got interested in martial arts. She was big fan of Action movies starring the likes of Jackie Chan, Jet Li and Jean-Claude Van Damme and was a big fan of boxing and later MMA. She was a youngster when she decided to start practicing martial arts and was around the age of 16 when she started jujutsu and BJJ at age of 18.

Mixed martial arts career

Early career
Davis made her mixed martial arts debut on April 7, 2007, at UCW 7: Anarchy. She was defeated by former Strikeforce champion Sarah Kaufman via TKO in the third round. On December 14, 2007, Davis defeated Valérie Létourneau by split decision at TKO 31: Young Guns. The fight was the second women's bout in TKO history. Davis faced Liz Carreiro at FFF 4: Call of the Wild on April 3, 2008. She won the fight by unanimous decision.

On January 23, 2009, Davis faced Tara LaRosa at Extreme Challenge: The War at the Shore. She lost by TKO in the third round after the ringside doctor stopped the fight due to a cut. The fight was voted as the 2009 Women's MMA Fight of the Year. Davis defeated Molly Helsel by unanimous decision after five rounds at Raging Wolf 5: Mayhem In The Mist on October 10, 2009, to become Raging Wolf Women's Flyweight Champion.

On March 27, 2010, at FCF 40, Davis replaced Jennifer Tate in the second round of the Freestyle Cage Fighting Women's Bantamweight Grand Prix. She faced submission specialist Shayna Baszler and was defeated by unanimous decision. Davis was scheduled to face Elaina Maxwell at Raging Wolf 7: Mayhem In The Mist 3 on May 8, 2010, but Maxwell pulled out of the fight due to an injury. Davis defended her Raging Wolf title against Tonya Evinger instead. She won the fight and retained her title via rear-naked choke submission in the third round.

Davis' next fight was against Elaina Maxwell at Raging Wolf 9 on August 28, 2010. This fight was originally for the Raging Wolf Women's Flyweight Championship, but Maxwell was unable to make the 135 lbs weight limit, so the fight was changed to a non-title, three-round contest. Davis was defeated by unanimous decision. Davis successfully defended her title in a rematch with Evinger at Raging Wolf 10 on November 6, 2010. She once again submitted Evinger with a rear-naked choke. She was scheduled to challenge Shayna Baszler in a title fight rematch at The Cage Inc.: Battle At The Border 10 on July 30, 2011. However, the fight was cancelled after Davis signed with Strikeforce.

Strikeforce
Davis made her Strikeforce debut on July 30, 2011, against Julie Kedzie. She won the fight via unanimous decision. She faced Amanda Nunes on September 10, 2011, on the Strikeforce Grand Prix Semifinals card. She won the fight via TKO late in the second round. On January 7, 2012, it was announced that Davis would face Sarah Kaufman in a rematch at Strikeforce: Tate vs. Rousey on March 3, 2012, in Columbus, Ohio. She lost the back and forth bout via a very close majority decision.

Invicta Fighting Championships
Davis faced Hitomi Akano at Invicta FC 2: Baszler vs. McMann on July 28, 2012. She defeated Akano by submission due to a rear-naked choke in the second round and earned a Submission of the Night bonus. Davis faced Shayna Baszler in a rematch at Invicta FC 4: Esparza vs. Hyatt on January 5, 2013. Davis won the fight via technical submission due to a rear-naked choke in the third round. The bout was named Fight of the Night.

Ultimate Fighting Championship
On Feb 12, 2013, it was announced that both Davis and Sara McMann were signed to the UFC. Davis faced Rosi Sexton in her UFC debut at UFC 161 on June 15. She won the back-and-forth fight via unanimous decision. In her second UFC bout, Davis faced Liz Carmouche on November 6, 2013, at UFC Fight Night 31. She won the fight via unanimous decision. Davis faced Jessica Eye on February 22, 2014, at UFC 170. Davis won the fight via split decision.

Davis faced UFC Women's Bantamweight Champion Ronda Rousey for the belt at UFC 175 on July 5, 2014. She lost the fight via knockout sixteen seconds into the first round.

Davis faced Sarah Kaufman for a third time at UFC 186 on April 25, 2015. After losing the first round due to Kaufman's dominating striking, she won the fight via submission in the second round. Following this fight, Davis took time off due to pregnancy.

On October 19, 2016, it was announced that she would be making her return at The Ultimate Fighter 24 Finale on December 3, 2016 against Sara McMann She lost that fight via arm-triangle submission in the second round.

Davis next faced Cindy Dandois on April 22, 2017, at UFC Fight Night: Swanson vs. Lobov. She won the fight by unanimous decision.

Davis faced Liz Carmouche in a flyweight bout at UFC Fight Night: Swanson vs. Ortega on December 9, 2017. She won the fight by split decision.

Davis faced Katlyn Chookagian on July 28, 2018, at UFC on Fox 30. She lost the fight by unanimous decision.

Davis faced Jennifer Maia on March 23, 2019 at UFC Fight Night 148. She lost the fight via unanimous decision.

Davis faced Viviane Araújo on July 27, 2019 at UFC 240. She lost the fight via unanimous decision.

Davis faced Sabina Mazo in a return to bantamweight on February 27, 2021 at UFC Fight Night 186. She won the fight via unanimous decision.

Davis faced Pannie Kianzad on June 12, 2021 at UFC 263. In a competitive fight, Davis was able to out-land her opponent, though commentators frequently found her striking less effective, remaining notably uncertain of the winner at the end of the fight. This was ultimately not reflected in the scoring, with Davis winning only one round on one scorecard, in a unanimous decision loss.

Davis faced Julija Stoliarenko at UFC Fight Night 200 on February 5, 2022. She won the fight via unanimous decision. Later in that month, it was announced that she had fought out her prevailing contract and it was not renewed.

Championships and accomplishments
Invicta Fighting Championships
Submission of the Night 
Fight of the Night 
Raging Wolf MMA
RW Women's Bantamweight Championship (one time)
Two successful title defenses

Mixed martial arts record

|Win
| align=center|21–11
|Julija Stoliarenko
|Decision (unanimous)
|UFC Fight Night: Hermansson vs. Strickland
| 
|align=center|3
|align=center|5:00
|Las Vegas, Nevada, United States
|
|-
|Loss
|align=center|20–11
|Pannie Kianzad
|Decision (unanimous)
|UFC 263 
|
|align=center|3
|align=center|5:00
|Glendale, Arizona, United States
|
|-
|Win
|align=center|20–10
|Sabina Mazo
|Decision (unanimous)
|UFC Fight Night: Rozenstruik vs. Gane 
|
|align=center|3
|align=center|5:00
|Las Vegas, Nevada, United States
|
|-
|Loss
|align=center|19–10
|Viviane Araújo
|Decision (unanimous)
|UFC 240 
|
|align=center|3
|align=center|5:00
|Edmonton, Alberta, Canada
|
|-
|Loss
|align=center|19–9
|Jennifer Maia
|Decision (unanimous)
|UFC Fight Night: Thompson vs. Pettis 
|
|align=center|3
|align=center|5:00
|Nashville, Tennessee, United States
|
|-
|Loss
|align=center|19–8
|Katlyn Chookagian
|Decision (unanimous)
|UFC on Fox: Alvarez vs. Poirier 2
|
|align=center|3
|align=center|5:00
|Calgary, Alberta, Canada
|
|-
|Win
|align=center|19–7
|Liz Carmouche
|Decision (split)
|UFC Fight Night: Swanson vs. Ortega
|
|align=center|3
|align=center|5:00
|Fresno, California, United States
| 
|-
|Win
|align=center|18–7
|Cindy Dandois
|Decision (unanimous)
|UFC Fight Night: Swanson vs. Lobov
|
|align=center|3
|align=center|5:00
|Nashville, Tennessee, United States
|
|-
|Loss
|align=center|17–7
|Sara McMann
|Submission (arm-triangle choke)
|The Ultimate Fighter: Tournament of Champions Finale
|
|align=center|2
|align=center|2:52
|Las Vegas, Nevada, United States
|
|-
| Win
| align=center| 17–6
| Sarah Kaufman
| Submission (armbar)
| UFC 186
| 
| align=center| 2
| align=center| 1:52
| Montreal, Quebec Canada
| 
|-
| Loss
| align=center| 16–6
| Ronda Rousey
| KO (punches)
| UFC 175
| 
| align=center| 1
| align=center| 0:16
| Las Vegas, Nevada, United States
| 
|-
| Win
| align=center| 16–5
| Jessica Eye
| Decision (split)
| UFC 170
| 
| align=center| 3
| align=center| 5:00
| Las Vegas, Nevada, United States
| 
|-
| Win
| align=center| 15–5
| Liz Carmouche
| Decision (unanimous)
| UFC: Fight for the Troops 3
| 
| align=center| 3
| align=center| 5:00
| Fort Campbell, Kentucky, United States
| 
|-
| Win
| align=center| 14–5
| Rosi Sexton
| Decision (unanimous)
| UFC 161
| 
| align=center| 3
| align=center| 5:00
| Winnipeg, Manitoba, Canada
| 
|-
| Win
| align=center| 13–5
| Shayna Baszler
| Technical Submission (rear-naked choke)
| Invicta FC 4: Esparza vs. Hyatt
| 
| align=center| 3
| align=center| 0:58
| Kansas City, Kansas, United States
| 
|-
| Win
| align=center| 12–5
| Hitomi Akano
| Submission (rear-naked choke)
| Invicta FC 2: Baszler vs. McMann
| 
| align=center| 2
| align=center| 3:41
| Kansas City, Kansas, United States
| 
|-
| Loss
| align=center| 11–5
| Sarah Kaufman
| Decision (majority)
| Strikeforce: Tate vs. Rousey
| 
| align=center| 3
| align=center| 5:00
| Columbus, Ohio, United States
| 
|-
| Win
| align=center| 11–4
| Amanda Nunes
| TKO (punches)
| Strikeforce: Barnett vs. Kharitonov
| 
| align=center| 2
| align=center| 4:53
| Cincinnati, Ohio, United States
| 
|-
| Win
| align=center| 10–4
| Julie Kedzie
| Decision (unanimous)
| Strikeforce: Fedor vs. Henderson
| 
| align=center| 3
| align=center| 5:00
| Hoffman Estates, Illinois, United States
|
|-
| Win
| align=center| 9–4
| Tonya Evinger
| Submission (rear-naked choke)
| RW 10: Mayhem In The Mist 5
| 
| align=center| 1
| align=center| 1:25
| Niagara Falls, New York, United States
|
|-
| Loss
| align=center| 8–4
| Elaina Maxwell
| Decision (unanimous)
| RW 9: Mayhem In The Mist 4
| 
| align=center| 3
| align=center| 5:00
| Niagara Falls, New York, United States
| 
|-
| Win
| align=center| 8–3
| Tonya Evinger
| Submission (rear-naked choke)
| RW 7: Mayhem In The Mist 3
| 
| align=center| 3
| align=center| 1:47
| Niagara Falls, New York, United States
| 
|-
| Loss
| align=center| 7–3
| Shayna Baszler
| Decision (unanimous)
| Freestyle Cage Fighting 40
| 
| align=center| 3
| align=center| 5:00
| Shawnee, Oklahoma, United States
| 
|-
| Win
| align=center| 7–2
| Molly Helsel
| Decision (unanimous)
| RW 5: Mayhem In The Mist
| 
| align=center| 5
| align=center| 5:00
| Niagara Falls, New York, United States
| 
|-
| Loss
| align=center| 6–2
| Tara LaRosa
| TKO (doctor stoppage)
| Extreme Challenge: The War At The Shore
| 
| align=center| 3
| align=center| 4:23
| Atlantic City, New Jersey, United States
| 
|-
| Win
| align=center| 6–1
| Margarita Kolmykova
| Submission (rear-naked choke)
| USFL: War In The Woods 5
| 
| align=center| 1
| align=center| 1:02
| Ledyard, Connecticut, United States
|
|-
| Win
| align=center| 5–1
| Kate Roy
| Submission (armbar)
| Ultimate Cage Wars 12
| 
| align=center| 1
| align=center| 3:09
| Winnipeg, Manitoba, Canada
| 
|-
| Win
| align=center| 4–1
| Lizbeth Carreiro
| Decision (unanimous)
| FFF 4: Call Of The Wild
| 
| align=center| 3
| align=center| 3:00
| Los Angeles, California, United States
| 
|-
| Win
| align=center| 3–1
| Valérie Létourneau
| Decision (split)
| TKO 31: Young Guns
| 
| align=center| 3
| align=center| 5:00
| Montreal, Quebec, Canada
| 
|-
| Win
| align=center| 2–1
| Tannaya Hantelman
| Submission (armbar)
| ECC 6: Hometown Heroes
| 
| align=center| 1
| align=center| 1:09
| Halifax, Nova Scotia, Canada
| 
|-
| Win
| align=center| 1–1
| Jody Wadsworth
| TKO (punches)
| KO Boxing: Warzone
| 
| align=center| 1
| align=center| 3:17
| Edmonton, Alberta, Canada
| 
|-
| Loss
| align=center| 0–1
| Sarah Kaufman
| TKO (punches)
| UCW 7: Anarchy
| 
| align=center| 3
| align=center| N/A
| Winnipeg, Manitoba, Canada
|

Championships and achievements
Raging Wolf MMA
Raging Wolf Women's Bantamweight Championship (One time)
Invicta FC
Fight of the Night (One time) vs. Shayna Baszler
Ultimate Fighting Championship
First Canadian Woman to Fight in the UFC
First Canadian Woman to Win a Fight in the UFC
Women's MMA Awards
2009 Fight of the Year vs. Tara LaRosa
2012 Fight of the Year vs. Sarah Kaufman

See also
List of Canadian UFC fighters
List of female mixed martial artists

References

External links

1984 births
Canadian female mixed martial artists
Canadian practitioners of Brazilian jiu-jitsu
People awarded a black belt in Brazilian jiu-jitsu
Female Brazilian jiu-jitsu practitioners
Canadian jujutsuka
Mixed martial artists utilizing jujutsu
Mixed martial artists utilizing Brazilian jiu-jitsu
Canadian submission wrestlers
Living people
People from Port Colborne
Bantamweight mixed martial artists
Ultimate Fighting Championship female fighters